A fighting cock is a rooster used in the blood sport of cockfighting.

Fighting cock may also refer to:

 The Fighting Cocks: music venue in London, England.

 Fighting Cock (bourbon)
 The Fighting Cock, a 1963 Australian made-for-television film
 Fighting Cocks (fighter squadron), a fighter unit of the United States Air Force

See also
 Ye Olde Fighting Cocks, a public house in St Albans, Hertfordshire